The men's 400 metres hurdles event at the 2011 Summer Universiade was held on 17–19 August.

Medalists

Results

Heats
Qualification: First 4 of each heat (Q) and the next 4 fastest (q) qualified for the semifinals.

Semifinals

Qualification: First 2 of each semifinal (Q) and the next 2 fastest (q) qualified for the final.

Final

References
Heats results
Semifinals results
Final results

Hurdles
2011